Badarpur Border is an elevated station on the Violet Line of the Delhi Metro. The station is located close to the interstate border between the city of Faridabad in Haryana and Badarpur in Delhi and sees a large daily ridership owing to this fact. It was the terminal station of the Violet Line till September 5, 2015. It was earlier known as Badarpur, and was renamed in December 2014.

History 
The station was opened on 14 January 2011, as part of the Sarita Vihar—Badarpur section of the line, and situated in Badarpur, Delhi. Initially, Badarpur Metro Station faced huge crowding problems, as it acted as a terminal for Delhi Metro. With the opening of a 14 km southward stretch between Badarpur in Delhi to Escorts Mujesar Faridabad on September 6, 2015, this station will now see less congestion as it was before. Some of the Metro Services terminate here.

The station

Station layout

Facilities 
The station also houses several ATMs, food kiosks and a book store run by WHSmith. List of available ATMs at Badarpur metro station: HDFC Bank, State Bank of India, Yes Bank, IndusInd Bank, Ratnakar Bank.

Entry/Exit

Connections

Bus 
Delhi Transport Corporation bus routes number 8, 34, 34A, 405, 405A, 405ASTL, 418A, 418ALnkSTL, 433, 433CL, 433STL, 440A, 443, 460, 460CL, 460STL, 473, 473CL, 479, 479ACL, 479CL, 479STL, 511, 511A, 511ASTL, 525STL, 544, 717, 717A, 717B, 724A, 774, 874,
Badarpur Border Terminal – Gurugram Bus Stand
Ballabgarh Bus Stand – Panipat
Ballabgarh Bus Stand – Sonipat from outside metro station stop.

See also 

Delhi
Sarita Vihar
Badarpur, Delhi
Tughlaqabad Fort
List of Delhi Metro stations
Transport in Delhi
Delhi Metro Rail Corporation
Delhi Suburban Railway
Delhi Monorail
Delhi Transport Corporation
South East Delhi
New Delhi
National Capital Region (India)
List of rapid transit systems
List of metro systems

References

External links 

 Delhi Metro Rail Corporation Ltd. (Official site)
 Delhi Metro Annual Reports
 
 UrbanRail.Net – Descriptions of all metro systems in the world, each with a schematic map showing all stations.

Delhi Metro stations
Railway stations opened in 2011
Railway stations in South Delhi district